Gianfrancesco Bembo, C.R.S. or Giovanni Francesco Bembo (30 December 1659 – 21 July 1720) was a Roman Catholic prelate who served as Bishop of Belluno (1694–1720).

Biography
Gianfrancesco Bembo  was born in Venice, Italy on 30 December 1659 and ordained a priest in the Clerks Regular of Somasca in 1678.
On 1 March 1694, he was appointed during the papacy of Pope Innocent XII as Bishop of Belluno.
On 7 March 1694, he was consecrated bishop by Paluzzo Paluzzi Altieri Degli Albertoni, Cardinal-Bishop of Palestrina, with Odoardo Cibo, Titular Patriarch of Constantinople, and Petrus Draghi Bartoli, Titular Patriarch of Alexandria, serving as co-consecrators. 
He served as Bishop of Belluno until his death on 21 July 1720.

While bishop, he was the principal co-consecrator of Marco Gradenigo, Coadjutor Patriarch of Aquileia and Titular Bishop of Titopolis (1701) .

References

External links and additional sources
 (for Chronology of Bishops) 
 (for Chronology of Bishops)  

17th-century Italian Roman Catholic bishops
18th-century Italian Roman Catholic bishops
Bishops appointed by Pope Innocent XII
1659 births
1720 deaths